Ganjabad (also Romanized as Ganjābād; also known as Ganjehābād) is a village in Jarqavieh Sofla Rural District, Jarqavieh Sofla District, Isfahan County, Isfahan Province, Iran. At the 2006 census, its population was 119, in 39 families.

References 

Populated places in Isfahan County